On a Sensual Note (OASN) is the first collegiate a cappella singing ensemble of American University, welcome to male-identifying individuals as well as non-binary folk. Founded in the fall of 1996, OASN is the university's oldest a cappella ensemble. The ensemble performs regularly at campus events, tours and visits other schools and participates in regional festivals. OASN's most popular events include its biannual end-of-semester concerts in the Kay Spiritual Life Center, a tradition which has been mirrored by newer performing ensembles. OASN is the only collegiate a cappella group at American University to go on a Spring Break Tour to a specific destination, commonly on the East Coast; recent destinations include: New Orleans, LA, Miami, FL, Savannah, GA, and Charlotte, NC.

History

The Early Years
In the fall of 1996, Jay Criscuolo and Jay Rao arrived as freshman at American University, each with a desire to participate in the collegiate legacy of men’s a cappella. Upon learning that there were no a cappella groups at AU, both independently began a search to find members to start a group. Eventually, they found each other. In their early months of searching, the group grew to only six members. It was not until the spring of 1998 that the group of six, under the name “Tastes Like Chicken”, got its first gig.

The Present
Since its beginning, the group has established themselves as one of the most well-known a cappella groups in the D.C. area, performing at many prominent venues in the city and surrounding area. OASN has released six albums and has taken multiple tours up and down the eastern seaboard. OASN has recently begun production of their seventh album. The group plans on having the album complete by Fall of 2017. Since the group went virtual due to COVID-19 in March of 2020, the group has expanded and is back to performing in-person in the hope to perform at venues across the District in the near future.

Notable Performances
The group's most notable performance came on January 28, 2008 when the campaign of then U.S. Presidential candidate Barack Obama asked OASN to open for a rally at AU where Obama was endorsed by Senator Ted Kennedy. The ensemble learned Obama's campaign theme song, Stevie Wonder's "Signed, Sealed, Delivered I'm Yours" (1970), but was forced offstage after a teleprompter was kicked during their performance.

Since then, the group has performed at The White House, the Embassy of Singapore, Disney World, the National Cherry Blossom Festival, and for the U.S Secretary of Labor.

Discography

Albums
Aural Pleasure (2001)
Back to the Drawing Board (2002)
The On a Sensual Note (2004)
New Ties, Old Guys (2006)
On a Sensual Night (2008)
Spare Change (2009)
Guys in Ties (2014)

See also
American University
List of collegiate a cappella groups in the United States
Collegiate A Cappella

References

External links

American University
Musical groups established in 1996
Collegiate a cappella groups